Rebecca Emes (died 1830) was an English silversmith, known for her household silverware.

Little is known of her life. She married the engraver and watercolour painter John Emes. In 1796 John Emes became partner in the London silversmith company of Thomas Chawner and his son Henry Chawner. The firm specialized in silver tea and coffee services. When the elder Chawner retired, Emes became sole owner and presumably he carried on his own work of creating engravings for publications while Rebecca started to work in the silversmith business. John Emes died in 1808 and Rebecca became a partner with Edward Barnard, the foreman, and Henry Chawner. The firm, which operated under the name Rebecca Emes & Edward Barnard, grew considerably during their tenure. Emes withdrew from the business in 1829.

References

 Emes & Barnard Silversmiths on Archives hub

18th-century births
1830 deaths
English silversmiths
English women artists
Women silversmiths
19th-century English artists
Year of birth missing
19th-century English women